Presidential elections were held in Northern Cyprus on 15 April 2000. Incumbent president Rauf Denktaş was the lead candidate in the first round, but failed to cross the 50% threshold to win outright. However, the second-placed candidate Derviş Eroğlu forfeited the election and the second round was not held.

Results

References

Northern Cyprus
Presidential elections
Presidential elections in Northern Cyprus
2000 in Northern Cyprus
2000s in Cypriot politics
April 2000 events in Europe

2000 elections in Asia